Salliqueló Partido is a partido of Buenos Aires Province in Argentina.

Settlements
 Estación Graciarena
 Quenumá
 Salliqueló

External links
  Sitio Municipal

Populated places established in 1961
Partidos of Buenos Aires Province